Idris Azad (Idrees Ahmad ) born  on 7 August 1969, is an author, philosopher, novelist, poet, dramatist and columnist. He has written several books on fiction, journalism, critic, poetry, philosophy, mysticism and art. He is teacher of logic and philosophy at International Islamic University, Islamabad. Idrees Azad is also associated with Pakistan Film Industry. He is Head of the Department of VFX & CGI at Paragon Academy of Performing Arts, Shabab Noor Studio, Lahore and assists the director Syed Noor in film making as well.

Early life 

Azad was born in the house of Saeed Ahmad, in Khushab, city of Punjab, Pakistan. He got his Masters in Philosophy from the University of the Punjab, Lahore.

Philosophy 

He elucidated socio-biological evolution. He expands the idea of the Pakistani philosopher Sir Muhammad Iqbal that every living organism on Earth is tightly attached to it and it needs an anti-gravitational force to get rid of Earth-rootedness. He calls this freedom from Earth-Rootedness. He asserts that, being nearer the Earth degrades the value of life. He also asserts that socio-biologically, there are four classes of animals.

 Swarm 
 Gangs 
 Droves 
 Flocks

Publications 

Philosophy
 Aurat, Iblees aur Khuda (Women, Devil and God)
 Maoseeqi, Tasweer aur Sharaab() (Music, Picture and Vine)
 Islam Maghrib kay Katehray Main (Islam in the court of West)
 Tassawuf, Science aur Iqbal (Mysticism, Science and Iqbal)
 Companion To Philosophy And Logic

Novels
 Sultan Muhammad Fateh
 Ibn e Attaash
 Sultan Shamsuddin Altamash()
 Behr e Aswad kay Us Paar
 Undlus kay Qazzaaq
 Qartaajna

Other Books
 Nai Saleebi Jang aur Usaama
 Baazgusht()
 Manashiyaat aur Tadaaruk
 Nijaat kay Raastay Par
 Ibn e Maryam Hua karay Koi()

References

External links 

 
 Official Website

Living people
1969 births
People from Khushab District
Pakistani poets
Urdu-language poets from Pakistan
Urdu-language fiction writers
Pakistani novelists
Pakistani scholars
University of the Punjab alumni
Academic staff of the International Islamic University, Islamabad